The Medalla de la campaña de Rusia ("Medal of the Russian Campaign"), commissioned 9 November 1943, was awarded by Nationalist Spain to those Spanish volunteers who served at the Russian front during World War II, as members of the Blue Division. This force, attached to the Heer of the Wehrmacht, known as the 250th Infantry Division, was in total composed of 47,000 men, sent by Francisco Franco to aid the Third Reich, as a way to pay back Adolf Hitler's help during the Spanish Civil War.

Description 
 The obverse is a Nationalist Spain Eagle with an Iron Cross, with the swastika, above the Falange's symbol, all surrounded by a laurel circle and a crown on the top
 On the reverse the Novgorod's Kremlin surrounded with chains and the inscription "Rusia 1941"

References

See also 
 Blue Division Medal (Germany)
 Blue Division
 Spanish Civil War

Awards established in 1943
Spain in World War II
Spanish campaign medals
Soviet Union–Spain relations
Military awards and decorations of World War II
Eastern Front (World War II)
Germany–Spain military relations